The 1966 SMU Mustangs football team represented Southern Methodist University (SMU) as a member of the Southwest Conference (SWC) during the 1966 NCAA University Division football season. Led by fifth-year head coach Hayden Fry, the Mustangs compiled an overall record of 8–3 with a conference mark of 6–1, winning the SWC title.

The Mustangs seemingly blew their chances at the SWC championship with a 22–0 loss on November 12 at Arkansas, the two-time reigning SWC champion. However, SMU's title hopes reopened by Texas Tech, which upended the Razorbacks, 21–16 in Arkansas' season finale on November 19. Seven days later, SMU shut out rival TCU, 21–0. 

SMU earned a berth in the Cotton Bowl Classic, played in their home stadium, the Cotton Bowl. The Mustangs lost the game to Georgia on New Year's Eve.

Schedule

Roster

References

SMU
SMU Mustangs football seasons
Southwest Conference football champion seasons
SMU Mustangs football